The 1992 NBL season was the 11th season of the National Basketball League. Canterbury won the championship in 1992 to claim their fourth league title. They qualified in fourth place for the six-team finals and beat Otago and Hutt Valley to book a spot in the decider. Canterbury's grand final experience proved decisive, overcoming Palmerston North by eight points, 79–71.

Final standings

Season awards
 NZ Most Valuable Player: Neil Stephens (Wellington)
 Most Outstanding Guard: Tyrone Brown (New Plymouth)
 Most Outstanding NZ Guard: Warwick Meehl (Waitakere)
 Most Outstanding Forward: Donnell Thomas (Nelson)
 Most Outstanding NZ Forward/Centre: Neil Stephens (Wellington)
 Scoring Champion: Kerry Boagni (Wellington)
 Rebounding Champion: Joe Turner (Waitakere)
 Assist Champion: Tyrone Brown (New Plymouth)
 Rookie of the Year: Pero Cameron (Waikato)
 Coach of the Year: Steve McKean (New Plymouth)
 All-Star Five:
 Tony Brown (Hutt Valley)
 Tyrone Brown (New Plymouth)
 Willie Burton (New Plymouth)
 DeWayne McCray (Palmerston North)
 Donnell Thomas (Nelson)

References

National Basketball League (New Zealand) seasons
1992 in New Zealand basketball